Ranjit Vilas Palace is the principal palace and, until 2012, the residence of the royal family of the princely state of Wankaner in what is now the Indian state of Gujarat.

Location 
The palace is located atop a hill in the Gadhio Hills and overlooks both the town of Wankaner and the Machchhu River.

History 
Construction of the palace began in 1907 and its foundation stone was laid by the Jamsaheb of Nawanagar, Ranjitsinhji, after whom the palace is named. Ranjitsinhji was a close friend of the Maharana of Wankaner, Amarsinhji Banesinhji, who is thought to have designed the building. It served as the residence of the royal family of Wankaner until 2012. The building suffered much damage in the Gujarat earthquake of 2001.

Architecture 
The palace was designed by the Maharana of Wankaner and is a mix of several styles of architecture including the Venetian-Gothic, Italianate, Mughal and Rajput styles. The three-storeyed building features a Venetian-Gothic façade, carved jharokha balconies which are a feature of Rajput palaces, gothic arches and Doric columns and Franco-Italian windowpanes. There is an Italianate marble fountain in the front garden. The sandstone of which the palace is built was sourced from quarries in Wankaner State. The palace also has a clock tower topped with an onion dome which suffered extensive damage in the 2001 earthquake.

Much of the decor and furnishings of the palace was imported from Europe. Its interiors are richly decorated and feature Italian marble flooring, Burma teak furniture and chandeliers from Murano and Belgium. The walls of the palace are adorned with what is claimed to be the largest collection of hunting trophies in India. An area of the palace was turned into a museum and the palace garage houses a collection of vintage cars.

Recent history 
The 2013 Hindi film Matru Ki Bijlee Ka Mandola was shot at the Ranjit Vilas Palace. In 2018, thieves broke into the palace and made away with loot worth Rs 3.4 million including silver chairs, a marble gold-plated Victorian clock and a silver replica of the Wankaner House in Mumbai.

References

External links 
 Visit to Wankaner Palace, Gujarat

Royal residences in India
Palaces in Gujarat